Otology is a branch of medicine which studies normal and pathological anatomy and physiology of the ear (hearing and vestibular sensory systems and related structures and functions) as well as their diseases, diagnosis and treatment. Otologic surgery generally refers to surgery of the middle ear and mastoid related to chronic otitis media, such as tympanoplasty, or ear drum surgery, ossiculoplasty, or surgery of the hearing bones, and mastoidectomy.  Otology also includes surgical treatment of conductive hearing loss, such as stapedectomy surgery for otosclerosis. 

Neurotology, a related field of medicine and subspecialty of otolaryngology, is the study of diseases of the inner ear, which can lead to hearing and balance disorders.  Neurotologic surgery generally refers to surgery of the inner ear or surgery that involves entering the inner ear with risk to the hearing and balance organs, including labyrinthectomy, cochlear implant surgery, and surgery for tumors of the temporal bone, such as intracanalicular acoustic neuromas.  Neurotology is expanded to include surgery of the lateral skull base to treat intracranial tumors related to the ear and surrounding nerve and vascular structures, such as large cerebellar pontine angle acoustic neuromas, glomus jugulare tumors and facial nerve tumors.

Some of the concerns of otology include:
 identifying the underlying mechanisms of Ménière's disease,
 finding the causes of tinnitus and developing treatment methods,
 defining the development and progression of otitis media

Related concerns of neurotology include:
 studying signal processing in the cochlear implant patient,
 investigating postural control areas and vestibulo-ocular mechanisms.
 studying the genetics of acoustic neuromas in patients with neurofibromatosis, to better understanding how to treat these tumors and prevent their growth.

See also

References